Craig Richard Cooper (born 28 February 1981) is a New Zealand badminton player who competed in the 2006 Commonwealth Games and the 2008 Summer Olympics.

Achievements

Oceania Championships
Men's doubles

Mixed doubles

BWF International Challenge/Series 
Men's doubles

Mixed doubles

 BWF International Challenge tournament
 BWF International Series tournament
 BWF Future Series tournament

References

External links
 
 

Living people
1981 births
Sportspeople from Wellington City
New Zealand male badminton players
Badminton players at the 2008 Summer Olympics
Olympic badminton players of New Zealand
Badminton players at the 2006 Commonwealth Games
Commonwealth Games competitors for New Zealand